American rock band the Killers have released seven studio albums, one live album, three compilation albums, one extended play, 38 singles, four promotional singles, and 39 music videos. Part of the post-punk revival movement, the Killers are influenced by music styles of the 1980s and 1990s. The band has sold over 28 million records worldwide. The group's debut album, Hot Fuss (2004), brought the band mainstream success, spawning four UK top-20 singles, including "Mr. Brightside". The album has since been certified triple platinum by the Recording Industry Association of America (RIAA) and seven-times platinum by the British Phonographic Industry (BPI), selling seven million copies worldwide.

The Killers' second studio album, Sam's Town, was released in October 2006, being met initially by mixed reviews but nonetheless proving a commercial success, debuting at number two on the Billboard 200 with opening sales of 315,000 units, and going on to be certified platinum by the RIAA. In the UK, the album debuted atop the chart and went on to be certified five-times platinum by the BPI. The compilation album Sawdust was released in November 2007, containing B-sides, rarities, and new material.

The band's third album, Day & Age, produced by Stuart Price, was released in November 2008 and spawned the commercially successful single "Human", described by Brandon Flowers as "our biggest song, pound for pound". Day & Age proved a commercial success in Europe, was certified Gold by the RIAA. Their fourth album, Battle Born, was released in September 2012, becoming the band's fourth consecutive album to reach number one in both the UK and Ireland.

In November 2013, in celebration of their first decade together, the band released their first greatest hits album, titled Direct Hits, a contractual requirement with their record label. The compilation features two new tracks, including "Shot at the Night", produced by Anthony Gonzalez of M83. In September 2017, the Killers released their fifth studio album, Wonderful Wonderful, becoming the band's fifth consecutive album to top the UK Albums Chart, as well as their first number-one album on the US Billboard 200.  In August 2020, the band released their sixth studio album, Imploding the Mirage, becoming the band's sixth consecutive album to top the UK Albums Chart and their highest rated by critics in the aggregate.

In August 2021, the band released their seventh studio album, Pressure Machine, and have begun work on recording an eighth.

Studio albums

Live albums

Compilation albums

Extended plays

Singles

Promotional singles

Other charted and certified songs

Guest appearances

Videography

Video albums

Music videos

Notes

References

External links
 
 
 

Alternative rock discographies
Discographies of American artists
Discography
Killers, The